Motion, known formally as Motion Industries, Inc., is an American distributor of industrial parts and industrial technology solutions headquartered in Birmingham, Alabama. Since 1972, it has been a wholly owned subsidiary of Genuine Parts Company.

History 
Motion Industries began as Owen Richards Co., an industrial supply company, which Caldwell Marks and William Spencer III purchased in 1946 in Birmingham. They changed the name to Motion Industries, according to the founders, "because everything we do moves – we're in the bearing and transmission business."

Marks and Spencer merged Motion Industries with Genuine Parts Company in 1972. Motion Industries now forms the Industrial Parts Group of Genuine Parts. According to Marks, Motion Industries was one of the first industrial distribution companies to establish a central distribution center and set up an electronic parts database.

In January 2021, Motion Industries announced an official rebrand as Motion. The company announced that "the move to rebrand is intended to solidify the company's structure and advance its position in the marketplace." The rebranding also coincided with Motion's 75th anniversary.

Operations 

Motion Industries is an industrial parts distributor for products including bearings; mechanical power transmission; electrical and industrial automation; hose, belting, and gaskets; hydraulic and pneumatics; process pumps; hydraulic and industrial hose; material handling; seals and accessories; and industrial/safety supplies. It also provides fabrication and repair services. The company's business units Motion Automation Intelligence (Motion Ai), Mi Conveyance Solutions and Mi Fluid Power Solutions were formed to offer specialized, related products and services in those respective areas.

As of 2021, Motion had annual sales of over $7 billion and 170,000 customers. Its customers cross numerous industries, including food and beverage, pulp and paper, iron and steel, chemical, mining and aggregate, petrochemical, automotive, semiconductor, wood and lumber, and medical and pharmaceuticals.  

Motion placed first in Modern Distribution Management's list of Top Bearings/PT Distributors in 2022, and third on Industrial Distribution's 2022 Big 50 list.

Facilities 
There are more than 700 Motion facilities, including branches, distribution and fulfillment centers, and service centers located throughout North America. Additionally, there are more than 150 locations in Australasia.

Acquisitions
Motion has made many acquisitions throughout the decades; a few of the larger ones include Berry Bearing (1993), BC Bearing/US Bearings/Norcan (2010), and Kaman Distribution Group (2022).

The acquisition of Inenco (completed 2019), now Motion Asia Pacific, expanded Motion's global markets.

Legal 
In 2012 Donald G. Maynor II, an employee, sued Motion Industries for age discrimination, alleging that the company fired him due to his age in violation of the West Virginia Human Rights Act.  In 2015 Motion Industries sued Superior Derrick Services for $1 million due to non-payment of a portion of a contract for parts delivered between 2011 and 2014.

References

External links 
 Official website

Companies based in Birmingham, Alabama
Business services companies established in 1946
1946 establishments in Alabama